The Kalma Theatre(갈마극장) is a theatre located in North Korea.

See also 

 List of theatres in North Korea

References 

Theatres in North Korea